General Skywalker may refer to:

Anakin Skywalker
Luke Skywalker
Star Wars Empire: "General" Skywalker